Ole Daniel Enersen (born March 14, 1943, in Oslo, Norway) is a Norwegian climber, photographer, journalist, writer, and medical historian.

In 1965 he made the first ascent of the Trollveggen mountain in Romsdalen, Norway, along with Leif Normann Petterson, Odd Eliassen and Jon Teigland.

In 2000 he published a novel in the fantasy genre, titled Dragen som elsket meg ("The dragon that loved me").

He publishes and maintains Who Named It?, a large online dictionary of medical eponyms.

See also
Who Named It?

References

1943 births
Norwegian medical historians
Living people
Norwegian mountain climbers
Norwegian male writers
Writers from Oslo